Auvers-Saint-Georges is a commune in the Essonne department in Île-de-France in northern France.

Inhabitants are known as Auversois.

Geography
The village lies on the right bank of the Juine, which forms all of the commune's north-western border.

See also
Communes of the Essonne department

References

External links

Official website 

Mayors of Essonne Association 

Communes of Essonne